James Leslie Wearmouth (1909-1989) was an Australian rugby league footballer who played in the 1930s.

Jim 'Bluey' Wearmouth played three first grade seasons with St George Dragons between 1929 and 1931. He played second row for the Saints in the 1930 Grand Final and retired the following year.
 By 1933, Jim Wearmouth was playing local A Grade for the Brighton Seagulls before retiring. 

Jim Wearmouth died on 20 September 1989, aged 80.

References

St. George Dragons players
Australian rugby league players
1909 births
1989 deaths
Rugby league second-rows

Rugby league players from Sydney